Salvador Hidalgo Oliva (born 27 December 1985) is a Cuban volleyball player, a member of Greek club Olympiacos. He has won the Asian Championship in 2012 and the European trophy CEV Challenge Cup in 2023. Hidalgo has been crowned Champion of Lebanon, China, Qatar and Turkey. 

He is noted for his excellent service, having been named the top server of the year in the Asian Champions League in 2010 and 2012, as well as in the German, Polish and Turkish Championships where he won this award again. He is an excellent scorer and has won the best scorer of the year award in the CEV Challenge Cup in 2010 and the Polish Championship in 2017.

Career

Clubs
In 2016 he went to Polish club Jastrzębski Węgiel. He became main player of the team and in half of season he achieved 6 individual awards in regular round for Most Valuable Player of the match. Since 2018, he plays for Fenerbahçe Men's Volleyball.

Sporting achievements

Clubs
Asian Championship
   2012 – with Al Arabi Qatar
  2010 – with Al Arabi Qatar (runner-up)
  2014 – with Al Rayan  (runner-up)
CEV Challenge Cup
   2022/2023 – with Olympiacos Piraeus
  2009/2010 – with Berlin RV
FIVB Club World Championship
  Brazil 2014 – with Al Rayyan  (runner-up)

National championships
 2008/2009  Lebanon Championship, with Bouchierie Lebanon
 2012/2013  Chinese Championship , with Beijing Baic Motor
 2013/2014  Russian Championship A , with Yugra Nizhnevartovsk
 2014/2015  GCC  Championship , with Al Rayan
 2014/2015  Qatar Cup , with Al Rayan
 2014/2015  Qatar Championship , with Al Rayan
 2015/2016  GCC  Championship , with Al Rayan
 2018/2019   Turkish Cup , with Fenerbahçe
 2018/2019  Turkish Championship , with Fenerbahçe
 2020  Turkish Super Cup , with Fenerbahçe

Individually
 2010 CEV Challenge Cup – Best Scorer
 2010 Asian Championship – Best Server
 2011 German Championship – Best Server
 2012 Asian Championship – Best Server
 2012 Asian Championship – Most Valuable Player
 2013 Chinese Championship – Most Valuable Player
 2013 Chinese Championship – Best Outside Hitter 
 2017 Polish Championship – Best Scorer 
 2017 Polish Championship – Best Spiker 
 2017 Polish Championship – Best Server
 2019 Turkish Cup – Best Outside Hitter
 2019 Turkish Cup – Most Valuable Player
 2019 Turkish Championship – Most Valuable Player
2021 Turkish Super Cup – Most Valuable Player 
 2022 Turkish Championship – Best Server

References

External links
 PlusLiga player profile

Living people
1985 births
Cuban men's volleyball players
Olympiacos S.C. players
Jastrzębski Węgiel players
Expatriate volleyball players in Poland
21st-century Cuban people